Newsgames are a genre of video games that attempt to apply journalistic principles to their gameplay. Newsgames can provide context to complex situations which might be hard to explain without experiencing the situation first hand. According to "Newsgames: Journalism at Play" written by newsgame innovators Ian Bogost, Simon Ferrari and Bobby Schweizer, newsgames are a “body of work produced at the intersection of video games and journalism.” Journalists use newsgames to expand on stories so the audience can learn more about the information in an immersive way.

Newsgames are usually based on real concepts, issues, or stories, but the games can also be a representation of the original research. This offers players a fictional experience based on real-world situations. They can also be thought of as the video game equivalent of political cartoons. Miguel Sicart describes them as games that "utilize the medium to participate in the public debate".

Examples

#Hacked, simulates the role of an investigative journalist who is working against a timeline to learn as much information about the Syrian War as possible.
The Voter Suppression Trail is a simulation game that highlights issues in the American voting system.
The Good, The Bad and The Accountant features players as the general manager of a city having to juggle corruption.
Syrian Journey puts players in the role of a Syrian refugee who just sold all of their possessions.
NarcoGuerra, a game based on the war on drugs and Mexican drug War, was released in June 2013.
Endgame:Syria, a game exploring the Syrian civil war that started in March 2011, which was refused by Apple's App Store and created a debate around the role of games, news and their distribution as a result.
 Sock and Awe, a game where you fling shoes at George W. Bush.
 Madrid, a game about memorializing the Madrid bombings.
 September 12th, a game about civilian casualties in the war on terror. 
Darfur is Dying, a game about the refugee crisis in Darfur.
Bacteria Salad, a game about the spinach E. coli contamination of 2006.
Jogo da Máfia, a Brazilian game that explains how globalized Mafia works.
Filosofighters, a journalistic game that explains basic philosophy concepts.
Snowden Run 3D, a game based on the events surrounding NSA leaker Edward Snowden.
1000 Days of Syria, a hypertext-based historical fiction game timelining the first 1000 days of the Syrian conflict.
Archanoid, an arcade game based on Breakout (Arkanoid) which describes the destruction of over 500 historical buildings in Moscow.
 HeartSaver: An Experimental News Game, April 2013 GEN Editors' Lab Hackathon, by Al Shaw, Sisi Wei and Amanda Zamora.
 Budget Hero, a so-called "policy flight simulator".
 JFK Reloaded, a video game that simulates the assassination of President John F. Kennedy

September 12th
The format started with the game September 12 by Gonzalo Frasca, published in 2003. In September 12, the player is positioned in a bomber in the sky, with its sights set on a village in the Middle East. The player must find and kill a terrorist within the village, which is heavily populated with civilians. The player needs to decide when to fire on the village, with the goal of causing as little collateral damage, as too much destruction may cause other civilians to become terrorists.

This marks the start of the newsgame format, in which experience and commentary from direct experiences are cited instead of news reports.

See also
 Immersive journalism

References

External links
 Journalism and video games come together as a new form of storytelling in Brazil
 Play the News: Fun and Games in Digital Journalism, by Max Foxman, Tow Center for Digital Journalism, February 17, 2015 -   - 
 Games for Change - Newsgames category
 American University JOLT program - Inventory of Newsgames
 University of Miami JournalismGames.com  - Inventory of 60+ Newsgames

Humanitarian video games
Video game types
Types of journalism